Rendsburg-Eckernförde is a district in Schleswig-Holstein, Germany. It is bounded by (from the east and clockwise) the city of Kiel, the district of Plön, the city of Neumünster, the districts of Segeberg, Steinburg, Dithmarschen and Schleswig-Flensburg, and the Baltic Sea.

History

In 1867 the Prussian administration established twenty districts in its province of Schleswig-Holstein, among them the districts of Rendsburg and Eckernförde. The present district was established in 1970 by merging the former districts.

Geography

The district is situated at the coast of the Baltic Sea, roughly between the cities of Schleswig and Kiel. A large portion of the Kiel Canal passes through Rendsburg-Eckernförde. It is one of the largest districts in the whole of Germany.

Coat of arms
The coat of arms displays:
 two lions (blue on yellow) from the arms of the Duchy of Schleswig
 a nettle leaf (white on red) from the arms of Holstein

Towns and municipalities

References

External links

 
Districts of Schleswig-Holstein